The Adventures of Wild Bill Hickok is an American Western television series that ran for eight seasons from April 15, 1951, through September 24, 1958. The Screen Gems series began in syndication, but ran on CBS from June 5, 1955, through 1958, and, at the same time, on ABC from 1957 through 1958. The Kellogg's cereal company was the show's national sponsor. The series was also exported to Australia during the late 1950s.

Synopsis
The Adventures of Wild Bill Hickok starred Guy Madison as the legendary Old West lawman (in real life, also a gunfighter) United States Marshal James Butler "Wild Bill" Hickok, and Andy Devine as his comedy sidekick, Jingles P. Jones. The series was set in the 1870s, with Hickok and Jones based at Fort Larabee.

Production
The series was produced by William F. Broidy Productions. It consisted of 113 episodes, the last 13 of which were made in color. In 1957 Screen Gems bought the Broidy company's assets, which included 100 Hickok episodes on film. Tommy Carr was the director. Kellogg's cereals sponsored it.

Episodes

Season 1 (1951)

Season 2 (1951-52)

Season 3 (1952)

Season 4 (1953)

Season 5 (1954-55)

Season 6 (1955)

Season 7 (1956)

Season 8 (1958)

Other media
Devine and Madison portrayed their roles on Mutual radio from April 1, 1951, to 1956.

During the 1950s, several episodes of the television show were spliced together and released as 16 feature films by Allied Artists.

Guest stars

Mike Ragan appeared in three episodes, as Gus in "The Tax Collecting Story", as Collier in "Mexican Rustlers Story" (both 1951), and Malone in "The Doctor's Story" (1953).
Carole Mathews appeared twice, first as Miss Jennings in "The Slocum Family" (1951) and then as Anne Hardy in "Blacksmith Story" (1952).
Ewing Mitchell, as Mr. Harker in "Chain of Events" (1953)
Gloria Saunders, as Sally Jones in "Boulder City Election" (1951)
William Tannen, as Rand in "The Doctor's Story" (1953) and as Tom Maples in "The Maverick" (1954)

Award nominations

References

External links

The Adventures of Wild Bill Hickok at CVTA
Behind-the-scenes production photos Collection of Stephen Lodge.

1951 American television series debuts
1958 American television series endings
1950s Western (genre) television series
Television series set in the 1870s
CBS original programming
American Broadcasting Company original programming
Cultural depictions of Wild Bill Hickok
First-run syndicated television programs in the United States
Black-and-white American television shows
Television series by Sony Pictures Television